
Boaz is a biblical figure in the Book of Ruth.

Boaz may also refer to:

Places in the United States
Boaz, Alabama
Boaz, Kentucky
Boaz, West Virginia
Boaz, Wisconsin

People

Given name
Boaz Bloomer, English industrialist
Boaz Davidson, Israeli filmmaker
Boaz Ellis, Israeli foil fencer
Boaz Frankel, television personality, who hosted and co-created Clips & Quips
Boaz Janay (born 1952), Israeli basketball player
Boaz Kofman, Israeli footballer
Boaz Mahune, Hawaiian civil leader
Bo'az Ma'uda, Israeli singer
Boaz Merenstein (born 1970), Israeli tennis player
Boaz Moda'i, Israeli diplomat
Boaz Myhill, American-born Welsh footballer
 Boaz Rodkin, Israeli ambassador to Albania
Boaz Solossa, Indonesian footballer
Boaz Weinstein, American hedge fund manager
Boaz Yakin, American screenwriter

Surname
David Boaz, libertarian and member of the Cato Institute
Donny Boaz,  American actor 
Hiram Abiff Boaz (1866–1962), American professor and Bishop in the Methodist Episcopal Church, South
Martha Boaz (1911–1995), American librarian
Noel T. Boaz, American biological anthropologist and physician, founder of Virginia Museum of Natural History
Sam Boaz, American jurist and legislator

Other
David ben Boaz, Karaite Jewish scholar who flourished in the tenth century CE
Boaz and Jachin, a pair of pillars in Solomon's Temple
Boaz mastodon

See also 

 Boas (disambiguation)